The 46 members of the Parliament of Vanuatu from 1991 to 1995 were elected on 2 December 1991.

List of members

References

 1991